Kosmos 147 ( meaning Cosmos 147) or Zenit-2 No.44 was a Soviet, first generation, low resolution, optical film-return reconnaissance satellite launched in 1967.

Kosmos 147 was launched by a Vostok-2 rocket, serial number N15001-06, flying from Site 41/1 at the Plesetsk Cosmodrome. The launch took place at 12:10:23 GMT on 13 March 1967, and following its successful arrival in orbit the spacecraft received its Kosmos designation; along with the International Designator 1967-022A and the Satellite Catalog Number 02710.

After eight days in orbit, Kosmos 147 was deorbited, with its return capsule descending under parachute and landing at 06:29 GMT on 21 March 1967, and recovered by the Soviet forces. An unspecified problem with the satellite resulted in the mission being considered a partial failure.

See also 

 1967 in spaceflight

References

Kosmos satellites
Spacecraft launched in 1967
Spacecraft which reentered in 1967
Zenit-2 satellites
1967 in the Soviet Union